K-9: P.I. is a 2002 American direct-to-video buddy cop comedy film, directed by Richard J. Lewis and starring James Belushi. The film serves as the fourth and final installment in the K-9 film series; and is the sequel to K-911.

After retiring from the LAPD, Detective Michael Dooley (Belushi) and his lovable K-9 Partner Jerry Lee go on one last adventure before they retire and start to enjoy the good life.

Plot
After retiring, Detective Dooley and Jerry Lee have a retirement party with all of their friends. After the party, Dooley and Jerry Lee are both drunk. They enter LA Micro Labs and find a dead security guard apparently shot by criminals who have stolen a chip. Jerry Lee and Dooley must now track down the criminals and retrieve the chip.

Cast

 James Belushi as Mike Dooley
 Gary Basaraba as Pete Timmons
 Kim Huffman as Laura Fields
 Jody Racicot as Maurice
 Christopher Shyer as Charles Thyer
 Barbara Tyson as Catherine
 Blu Mankuma as Captain Thomas
 Duncan Fraser as Frankie the Fence
 Jason Schombing as Carlos Cuesta
 Kevin Durand as Agent Verner
 Matthew Bennett as Agent Henry
 Jay Brazeau as Dr. Tilley
 Sarah Carter as Babe
 Terry Chen as Sato
 Dean Choe as Thief
 Michael Eklund as Billy Cochran
 G. Michael Gray as Junkie
 Ellie Harvie as Jackie Von Jarvis
 Dee Jay Jackson as Auto Pool Guy
 David Lewis as Jack Von Jarvis
 Angela Moore as Angie
 Natassia Malthe as Dirty Dancer (as Lina Teal)
 King as Jerry Lee

Reception

Critical response
On Rotten Tomatoes the film has an approval rating of 0% based 6 reviews.

See also
 List of films with a 0% rating on Rotten Tomatoes
 List of media set in San Diego

References

External links
 
 

2002 direct-to-video films
2002 films
Films about dogs
2002 action comedy films
American action comedy films
American buddy comedy films
American buddy cop films
Films shot in Vancouver
Direct-to-video sequel films
Universal Pictures direct-to-video films
Films set in San Diego
Fictional portrayals of the San Diego Police Department
2000s buddy cop films
Films with screenplays by Gary Scott Thompson
2002 comedy films
2000s English-language films
Films directed by Richard J. Lewis
2000s American films